Stand on Zanzibar is a dystopian New Wave science fiction novel written by John Brunner and first published in 1968. The book won a Hugo Award for Best Novel at the 27th World Science Fiction Convention in 1969, as well as the 1969 BSFA Award and the 1973 Prix Tour-Apollo Award.

Description
The primary engine of the novel's story is overpopulation and its projected consequences. The story is set in 2010, mostly in the United States. The narrative follows the lives of a large cast of characters, chosen to give a broad cross-section of the future world. Some of these interact directly with the central narratives, while others add depth to Brunner's world. Brunner appropriated this basic narrative technique from the USA Trilogy, by John Dos Passos.

The main storyline centres on two New York men, Donald Hogan and Norman Niblock House, who share an apartment. House is a rising executive at General Technics, one of the all-powerful corporations. Using his "Afram" (African American) heritage to advance his position, he has risen to vice-president at age twenty-six.

The two main plots concern the fictional African state of Beninia making a deal with General Technics to take over the management of their country, in a bid to speed up development from third world to first world status. A second major plot is a break-through in genetic engineering in the fictional South East Asian nation of Yatakang (an island nation and a former Dutch colony, like Indonesia), to which Hogan is soon sent by the US Government to investigate. The two plots eventually cross, bringing potential implications for the entire world.

Critical reception
Algis Budrys declared that Stand on Zanzibar "takes your breath away," saying that the novel "put[s] itself together seemingly without effort [and] paints a picture of the immediate future as it will, Brunner convinces you, certainly be." James Blish, however, received the novel negatively, saying "I disliked everybody in it and I was constantly impeded by the suspicion that Brunner was not writing for himself but for a Prize. ...A man of Brunner's gifts should have seen ab initio that U.S.A. was a stillbirth even in its originator's hands".

Thirty years after its initial publication, Greg Bear praised Stand on Zanzibar as a science fiction novel that, unusually, has not become dated since its original appearance: "It's not quite the future we imagined it to be, but it still reads as fresh as it did back in 1968, and that's an amazing accomplishment!" In a retrospective review for The Guardian in 2010, Sam Jordison found the novel a "skilfully realised future dystopia", writing that it allowed Brunner "to express his most interesting ideas regarding corporate ethics, free will, the question of whether scientific progress is always good for humanity and the conflict between the individual and the state". Ursula K. Heise declared that "Stand on Zanzibar, to some extent, sets the tone for literary texts from the 1980s and 1990s that reengage the issue of population growth against the background of a multitude of interacting political, social, economic, ecological, and technological problems".

In his 2021 book Doom: The Politics of Catastrophe, historian Niall Ferguson lauds Stand on Zanzibar for foreseeing the future better than more popular novels such as Fahrenheit 451, The Handmaid's Tale, Anthem, or the like.  He writes:

Yet, on further reflection, none of these authors truly foresaw all the peculiarities of our networked world, which has puzzlingly combined a rising speed and penetration of consumer information technology with a slackening
of progress in other areas, such as nuclear energy, and a woeful degeneration of governance. The real prophets turn out, on closer inspection, to be less familiar figures—for example, John Brunner, whose Stand on Zanzibar (1968) is set in 2010, at a time when population pressure has led to widening social divisions and political extremism. Despite the threat of terrorism, U.S. corporations like General Technics are booming, thanks to a supercomputer named Shalmaneser. China is America's new rival. Europe has united. Brunner also foresees affirmative action, genetic engineering, Viagra, Detroit's collapse, satellite TV, in-flight video, gay marriage, laser printing, electric cars, the de-criminalization of marijuana, and the decline of tobacco. There is even a progressive president (albeit of Beninia, not America) named "Obomi."

In a 2021 article regarding the prognostic ability of novelists, The Guardian pointed out that Stand on Zanzibar had accurately predicted the European Union, the rise of China as a superpower, the fall of the Detroit auto industry... and the inauguration of a... President named "Obomi."

Jonathan Nolan was partially inspired by Stand on Zanzibar in developing the content for the third season of the television show Westworld.

See also
 The Jagged Orbit
 Make Room! Make Room!
 The Sheep Look Up
 Shockwave Rider
 The World Inside

References
Notes

Bibliography

External links
 Ted Goia, "The Weird 1969 New Wave Sci-Fi Novel that Correctly Predicted the Current Day", March 25, 2013
 Stephen H. Goldman, "John Brunner's Dystopias: Heroic Man in Unheroic Society", Science Fiction Studies 16, 1978
 "From Technique to Critique: Knowledge and Human Interests in John Brunner’s Stand on Zanzibar, The Jagged Orbit, and The Sheep Look Up" (essay in Science Fiction Studies)
 Hephzibah Anderson, The 1968 sci-fi that spookily predicted today, 10 May 2019, bbc.com

1968 British novels
1968 science fiction novels
British science fiction novels
Doubleday (publisher) books
Dystopian novels
Fiction set in 2010
Hugo Award for Best Novel-winning works
Novels by John Brunner
Novels set in fictional countries
Overpopulation fiction
Zanzibar in fiction